The 1956 Ottawa Rough Riders finished in 3rd place in the IRFU with a 7–7 record but lost to the Hamilton Tiger-Cats in the East Semi-Final.

Preseason

Regular season

Standings

Schedule

Postseason

Playoffs

References

Ottawa Rough Riders seasons
1956 Canadian football season by team